Abel Ruben "Al" Espinosa (March 24, 1891 – January 4, 1957) was an American professional golfer.

Biography 
Espinosa was born on March 24, 1891 in Monterey, California. He was of Mexican American descent, and served in the U.S. Army in World War I. 

Espinosa won nine times on the PGA Tour in the 1920s and 1930s. He was on the Ryder Cup teams in 1927, 1929, and 1931, although he did not play in 1927. He lost to Leo Diegel in the PGA Championship finals in 1928. He tied with Bobby Jones in the U.S. Open in 1929 at Winged Foot, but lost by 23 strokes in the 36-hole playoff. He won the Mexican Open four times. His older brother Abe (1889–1980) also won on the PGA Tour. 

He died of cancer at age 65 in 1957 in San Francisco, and is buried at San Carlos Cemetery in Monterey.

Professional wins (20)

PGA Tour wins (9)
1924 (1) Missouri Open
1926 (1) Oklahoma City Open
1928 (2) Florida West Coast Open, Mid-America Open
1930 (1) Houston Open
1932 (1) Ohio Open
1933 (1) Ohio Open
1934 (1) Miami International Four-Ball (with Denny Shute)
1935 (1) Indianapolis Open

Other wins (11)
this list may be incomplete
1922 Washington Open
1923 Washington Open
1925 Chicago District Open Championship
1927 Illinois PGA Championship
1928 Illinois PGA Championship
1930 Illinois PGA Championship
1936 Ohio Open
1944 Mexican Open
1945 Mexican Open
1946 Mexican Open
1947 Mexican Open

Results in major championships

NYF = tournament not yet founded
NT = no tournament
CUT = missed the half-way cut
R64, R32, R16, QF, SF = round in which player lost in PGA Championship match play
"T" indicates a tie for a place

Summary

Most consecutive cuts made – 16 (1924 PGA – 1931 PGA) 
Longest streak of top-10s – 3 (1924 PGA – 1925 PGA)

See also
List of golfers with most PGA Tour wins

References

External links

American male golfers
PGA Tour golfers
Ryder Cup competitors for the United States
Golfers from California
American sportspeople of Mexican descent
Sportspeople from Monterey, California
1891 births
1957 deaths